Raoul II of Lusignan (c. 1200 – c. September 1, 1246, buried at the Abbey of Foucarmont) was the son of Raoul I of Lusignan and his wife Alix, Countess of Eu. He became Seigneur d'Exoudun and Count of Eu upon his father death in 1219.

He was married firstly in 1222 to Jeanne de Bourgogne (1200 – 1223, buried at the Abbaye de Foncarmont), daughter of Odo III, Duke of Burgundy.

His second wife, whom he married after 1223, was Yolande of Dreux (1196 – October 16, 1239); their daughter was:
 Marie, Countess of Eu 

Raoul's third wife was Philippe of Dammartin.

References

Sources 

 
 
 
 

1200 births
1240s deaths
House of Lusignan